Naqoyqatsi, also known as Naqoyqatsi: Life as War, is a 2002 American non-narrative film directed by Godfrey Reggio and edited by Jon Kane, with music composed by Philip Glass. It is the third and final installment in the Qatsi trilogy.

In the film's closing credits, Naqoyqatsi is also translated as "civilized violence" and "a life of killing each other".

Synopsis
According to Reggio, the film has no screenplay per se, but three movements (like those of a symphony) with different themes:

 Numerica.com: Language and place gives way to numerical code and virtual reality.
 Circus maximus: Competition, winning, records, fame, “fair play” and the love of money are elevated to the prime values of life. Life becomes a game.
 Rocketship twentieth century: A world that language can no longer describe. The resulting explosive tempo of technology is war and civilized violence.

Production
The September 11 attacks against the World Trade Center took place very close to the film's production studio, impacting the content of the film and further convincing the crew of the importance of its subject.

While Koyaanisqatsi and Powaqqatsi examine modern life in industrial countries and the conflict between encroaching industrialization and traditional ways of life, using slow motion and time-lapse footage of cities and natural landscapes, about eighty percent of Naqoyqatsi uses archive footage and stock images manipulated and processed digitally on non-linear editing (non-sequential) workstations and intercut with specially-produced computer-generated imagery to demonstrate society's transition from a natural environment to a technology-based one. Reggio described the process as "virtual cinema".

Music

The music is more in the traditional orchestral tradition than much of Glass's work as a familiar doorway to images so disconnected from the familiar world. One instrument, the cello played by Yo-Yo Ma, plays through much of the piece. Some non-orchestral instruments are used in addition to traditional ones, including a didgeridoo and an electronically-created jaw harp.

Soundtrack.net reviewer Glenn McClanan noted that unlike the previous two films, the music is more on the softer side.{{track listing
| headline = Naqoyqatsi: Original Motion Picture Soundtrack (2002)
| title1 = Naqoyqatsi
| length1 = 7:56
| title2 = Primacy of the Number
| length2 = 6:52
| title3 = Massman
| length3 = 9:48
| title4 = New World
| length4 = 3:04
| title5 = Religion
| length5 = 9:01
| title6 = Media Weather
| length6 = 7:54
| title7 = Old World
| length7 = 3:08
| title8 = Intensive Time
| length8 = 8:09
| title9 = Point Blank
| length9 = 11:17
| title10 = The Vivid Unknown
| length10 = 7:08
| title11 = Definition
| length11 = 2:50
| total_length = 79:17
}}

Release and reception
The film was released on DVD by Miramax on October 14, 2003.Amazon.com

The Criterion Collection released this as part of the Qatsi trilogy on December 11, 2012.

Rotten Tomatoes reported that 48% out of 52 reviews were positive with the average score of 5.82/10, and the consensus saying that it is "the weakest film in Reggio's trilogy".

See also
 Koyaanisqatsi: Life Out of Balance (1982)
 Chronos (1985)
 Powaqqatsi: Life in Transformation (1988)
 Baraka (1992)
 Samsara'' (2011)

References

External links

The Trilogy's Home Page

 
The Qatsi Trilogy: Celebration and Warning an essay by Scott MacDonald at the Criterion Collection

2002 films
2000s avant-garde and experimental films
2002 documentary films
American avant-garde and experimental films
Films scored by Philip Glass
Films without speech
Films directed by Godfrey Reggio
Non-narrative films
Collage film
American documentary films
2000s American films